Craig Dickenson (born September 4, 1971) is the head coach for the Saskatchewan Roughriders of the Canadian Football League (CFL). He has coached professional football since 2000 and won a Grey Cup championship with the Calgary Stampeders in 2008 and with the Edmonton Eskimos in 2015.

College career
Dickenson played college football as a kicker for the Montana Grizzlies.

Coaching career
Dickenson first coached in the Canadian Football League when he was hired by Wally Buono to be the receivers coach and offensive assistant for the Calgary Stampeders on March 25, 2002.

Following the 2018 CFL season, Dickenson interviewed for the Roughriders' vacant head coaching position following the departure of Chris Jones, and was subsequently promoted on January 25, 2019. The Riders finished 2019 with an improved record of 13-5, winning the West Division for the first time in a decade. After a disappointing season in 2022 there was much speculation about the future of the Riders' coaching staff, however, on November 1, 2022, it was announced that Dickenson would return as head coach. Offensive coordinator Jason Maas and three other offensive coaches did not have their contracts renewed.

CFL coaching record

Personal life
Dickenson is the older brother of Dave Dickenson, the head coach for the Calgary Stampeders.

References

External links
Saskatchewan Roughriders profile
Edmonton Eskimos profile 
Winnipeg Blue Bombers profile page

1971 births
Living people
Sportspeople from Great Falls, Montana
Players of American football from Montana
Montana Grizzlies football players
Coaches of American football from Montana
Montana Grizzlies football coaches
Utah State Aggies football coaches
San Diego Chargers coaches
Calgary Stampeders coaches
Montreal Alouettes coaches
Oakland Raiders coaches
Saskatchewan Roughriders coaches
Edmonton Elks coaches
Winnipeg Blue Bombers coaches